This is a list of Lord High Treasurers of England and later of Great Britain.

Early
Nigel, nephew of Roger, Bishop of Salisbury ( – 1133)
Adelelm, nephew of Roger, Bishop of Salisbury (c. 1136 – 1139)

Plantagenet
Richard FitzNeal, Dean of Lincoln, Bishop of London (c. 1158 – 1189)
William of Ely, Archdeacon of Cleveland (1196 – August 1215)
Eustace of Fauconberg, Bishop of London (4 November 1217 – October 1228)
Walter Mauclerk, Bishop of Carlisle (13 November 1228 – 14 January 1233)
Peter des Rivaux, Canon of St. Paul's (14 January 1233 – 1 June 1234)
Hugh de Pateshull, Bishop of Coventry (1 June 1234 – March 1240)
William Haverhill, Canon of Lichfield (March 1240 – 23 August 1252)
Philip Lovel, Archdeacon of Coventry (27 August 1252 – October 1258)
John Crakehall, Archdeacon of Bedford (2 November 1258 – 10 September 1260)
John of Caux, Abbot of Petersborough (28 October 1260 – March 1263)
Nicholas of Ely (6 May – 19 July 1263)
Henry, Prior of St. Radegund (July – November 1263)
John Chishull, acting (November 1263)
Roger de la Leye, acting (30 November 1263 – 3 November 1264)
Henry, Prior of St. Radegund (3 November 1264 – summer 1265)
Thomas Wymondham, Preceptor of Lichfield (23 October 1265 – 6 February 1270)
John Chishull (6 February 1270 – 9 June 1271)
Philip of Eye, Canon of St. Paul's (16 October 1271 – 2 October 1273)
Sir Joseph of Chauncy, Prior of the Knights of St. John in England (2 October 1273 – 18 June 1280)
Richard de Ware, Abbot of Westminster (18 June 1280 – 1283)
John Kirkby, Bishop of Ely (6 January 1284 – 26 March 1290)
William of March, Bishop of Bath and Wells (6 April 1290 – 16 August 1295)
John Droxford, acting (16 August – 28 September 1295)
Walter Langton, Bishop of Coventry and Lichfield (28 September 1295 – 22 August 1307)
Walter Reynolds, Bishop of Worcester (22 August 1307 – 6 July 1310)
John Sandall, Provost of Wells (6 July 1310 – 23 October 1311)
Walter Norwich, acting (23 October 1311 – 23 January 1312)
Walter Langton, Bishop of Coventry and Lichfield (23 January 1312 – 17 May 1312)
Walter Norwich, acting (17 May 1312 – 4 October 1312)
John Sandall, acting (4 October 1312 – 26 September 1314)
Walter Norwich (26 September 1314 – 27 May 1317)
John Hotham, Bishop of Ely (27 May 1317 – 10 June 1318)
John Walwayn, Canon of St. Paul's and Hereford (10 June – 16 November 1318)
John Sandall, Bishop of Winchester (16 November 1318 – 29 September 1319)
Walter Norwich, acting (29 September 1319 – 18 February 1320)
Walter de Stapledon, Bishop of Exeter (18 February 1320 – 25 August 1321)
Walter Norwich, acting (25 August 1321 – 10 May 1322)
Walter de Stapledon, Bishop of Exeter (10 May 1322 – 3 July 1325)
William Melton, Archbishop of York (3 July 1325 – 14 November 1326)
John de Stratford, Bishop of Winchester (14 November 1326 – 28 January 1327)
Adam Orleton, Bishop of Hereford (28 January – 28 March 1327)
Henry Burghersh, Bishop of Lincoln (28 March 1327 – 2 July 1328)
Thomas Charlton, Bishop of Hereford (2 July 1328 – 16 September 1329)
Robert Wodehouse, Archdeacon of Richmond (16 September 1329 – 1 December 1330)
William Melton, Archbishop of York (1 December 1330 – 1 April 1331)
William Ayermin, Bishop of Norwich (1 April 1331 – 29 March 1332)
Robert Ayleston, Archdeacon of Berkshire (29 March 1332 – 9 March 1334)
Richard Bury, Bishop of Durham (9 March – 1 August 1334)
Henry Burghersh, Bishop of Lincoln (1 August 1334 – 24 March 1337)
William de la Zouche, Dean of York (24 March 1337 – 10 March 1338)
Robert Wodehouse, Archdeacon of Richmond (10 March – 31 December 1338)
William de la Zouche, Dean of York (31 December 1338 – 2 May 1340)
Sir Robert Sadington (2 May – 26 June 1340)
Roger Northburgh, Bishop of Coventry and Lichfield (26 June – 1 December 1340)
Sir Robert Parning (15 January – 30 October 1341)
William Cusance (30 October 1341 – 12 April 1344)
William Edington, Bishop of Winchester (12 April 1344 – 29 November 1356)
John Sheppey, Bishop of Rochester (29 November 1356 – 19 October 1360)
Simon Langham, Bishop of Ely (23 November 1360 – 20 February 1363)
John Barnet, Bishop of Bath and Wells, later Bishop of Ely (20 February 1363 – 27 June 1369)
Thomas Brantingham, Bishop of Exeter (27 June 1369 – 27 March 1371)
Richard Scrope, 1st Baron Scrope of Bolton (27 March 1371 – 26 September 1375)
Sir Robert Assheton (26 September 1375 – 14 January 1377)
Henry Wakefield, Bishop of Worcester (14 January 1377 – 19 July 1377)
Thomas Brantingham, Bishop of Exeter (19 July 1377 – 1 February 1381)
Sir Robert Hales, Prior of the Order of St. John in England (1 February – 14 June 1381)
Sir Hugh Segrave (10 August 1381 – 17 January 1386)
John Fordham, Bishop of Durham (17 January – 24 October 1386)
John Gilbert, Bishop of Hereford (24 October 1386 – 4 May 1389)
Thomas Brantingham (4 May – 20 August 1389)
John Gilbert, Bishop of St David's (20 August 1389 – 2 May 1391)
John Waltham, Bishop of Salisbury (2 May 1391 – 17 September 1395)
Roger Walden, Archbishop of Canterbury (20 September 1395 – 22 January 1398)
Guy Mone, Bishop of St. David's (22 January 1398 – 17 September 1398)
William Scrope, 1st Earl of Wiltshire (17 September 1398 – 30 July 1399)

Lancaster and York
Sir John Norbury (3 September 1399 – 31 May 1401)
Laurence Allerthorp, Canon of London, Dean of Wolverhampton (31 May 1401 – 27 February 1402)
Henry Bowet, Bishop of Bath and Wells (27 February – 25 October 1402)
Guy Mone, Bishop of St. David's (25 October 1402 – 9 September 1403)
William de Ros, 6th Baron de Ros (9 September 1403 – 5 December 1404)
Thomas Nevill, 5th Baron Furnivall (5 December 1404 – 14 March 1407)
Nicholas Bubwith, Bishop of London (15 April 1407 – 14 July 1408)
Sir John Tiptoft (14 July 1408 – 6 January 1410)
Henry Scrope, 3rd Baron Scrope of Masham (6 January 1410 – 20 December 1411)
Sir John Pelham (23 December 1411 – 21 March 1413)
Thomas FitzAlan, 12th Earl of Arundel (21 March 1413 – 13 October 1415)
Sir Hugh Mortimer (10 January – 13 April 1416)
Sir Roger Leche (17 April – 23 November 1416)
Henry FitzHugh, 3rd Baron FitzHugh (6 December 1416 – 26 February 1421)
William Kinwolmarsh, Dean of St. Martin's le-Grand (26 February 1421 – 18 December 1422)
John Stafford, Bishop of Bath and Wells (18 December 1422 – 16 March 1426)
Walter Hungerford, 1st Baron Hungerford (16 March 1426 – 26 February 1432)
John Scrope, 4th Baron Scrope of Masham (26 February 1432 – 11 August 1433)
Ralph de Cromwell, 3rd Baron Cromwell (11 August 1433 – 7 July 1443)
Ralph Boteler, 1st Baron Sudeley (7 July 1443 – 18 December 1446)
Marmaduke Lumley, Bishop of Carlisle (18 December 1446 – 16 September 1449)
James Fiennes, 1st Baron Saye and Sele (16 September 1449 – 22 June 1450)
John Beauchamp, 1st Baron Beauchamp of Powick (22 June 1450 – 15 April 1452)
John Tiptoft, 1st Earl of Worcester (15 April 1452 – 15 March 1455)
James Butler, 5th Earl of Ormond and 1st Earl of Wiltshire (15 March – 29 May 1455)
Henry Bourchier, 1st Viscount Bourchier (29 May 1455 – 5 October 1456), later created Earl of Essex
John Talbot, 2nd Earl of Shrewsbury (5 October 1456 – 30 October 1458)
James Butler, 5th Earl of Ormond and 1st Earl of Wiltshire (30 October 1458 – 28 July 1460)
Henry Bourchier, 1st Viscount Bourchier, 1st Earl of Essex (28 July 1460 – 1461)
John Tiptoft, 1st Earl of Worcester (14 April 1462 – 24 June 1463)
Edmund Grey, 4th Baron Grey de Ruthin (24 June 1463 – 24 November 1464)
Walter Blount, 1st Baron Mountjoy (24 November 1464 – 1465)
Richard Woodville, 1st Earl Rivers (4 March 1466 – 12 August 1469)
Sir John Langstrother (16 August – 25 October 1469)
William Grey, Bishop of Ely (25 October 1469 – 10 July 1470)
John Tiptoft, 1st Earl of Worcester (10 July – 18 October 1470)
Sir John Langstrother (20 October 1470 – 22 April 1471)
Henry Bourchier, 1st Viscount Bourchier, 1st Earl of Essex (22 April 1471 – 4 April 1483)
Sir John Wood (17 May 1483 – 20 August 1484)
John Tuchet, 6th Baron Audley (6 December 1484 – August 1485)

Tudor
John Dynham, 1st Baron Dynham (14 July 1486 – 16 June 1501)
Thomas Howard, 2nd Duke of Norfolk (16 June 1501 – 4 December 1522)
Thomas Howard, 3rd Duke of Norfolk (4 December 1522 – 12 December 1546)
Edward Seymour, 1st Duke of Somerset (10 February 1547 – 10 October 1549)
William Paulet, 1st Marquess of Winchester (3 February 1550 – 10 March 1572)
William Cecil, 1st Baron Burghley (July 1572 – 4 August 1598)
Thomas Sackville, 1st Earl of Dorset (15 May 1599 – 19 April 1608)

Stuart

1603–1649
Robert Cecil, 1st Earl of Salisbury (4 May 1608 – 17 June 1612)
Commission of the Treasury (17 June 1612 – 24 June 1613)
Henry Howard, 1st Earl of Northampton, First Lord
Thomas Howard, 1st Earl of Suffolk 
Edward Somerset, 4th Earl of Worcester
Edward la Zouche, 11th Baron Zouche
Edward Wotton, 1st Baron Wotton
Sir Julius Caesar (Chancellor of the Exchequer)
Commission of the Treasury (24 June 1613 – 11 July 1614)
Thomas Egerton, 1st Baron Ellesmere, First Lord

Thomas Howard, 1st Earl of Suffolk (11 July 1614 – 1618)
Commission of the Treasury (July 1618 – 14 December 1620)
George Abbot, Archbishop of Canterbury, First Lord
Francis Bacon, 1st Baron Verulam
Sir Robert Naunton
Sir Fulke Greville (Chancellor of the Exchequer)
Sir Julius Caesar
Sir Edward Coke
Henry Montagu, 1st Viscount Mandeville (14 December 1620 – 29 September 1621)
Lionel Cranfield, 1st Earl of Middlesex (29 September 1621 – 25 April 1624)
James Ley, 1st Earl of Marlborough (11 December 1624 – 15 July 1628)
Richard Weston, 1st Earl of Portland (15 July 1628 – 1635)
Commission of the Treasury (15 March 1635 – 6 March 1636)
William Laud, Archbishop of Canterbury, First Lord
Henry Montagu, 1st Earl of Manchester
Francis Cottington, 1st Baron Cottington
Sir John Coke
Sir Francis Windebank
William Juxon, Bishop of London (6 March 1636 – 21 May 1641)
Commission of the Treasury (21 May 1641 – 3 October 1643)
Edward Littleton, 1st Baron Lyttleton of Mounslow, First Lord
Henry Montagu, 1st Earl of Manchester
Sir John Bankes
Edward Barrett, 1st Lord Barrett of Newburgh
Sir Henry Vane
Francis Cottington, 1st Baron Cottington (3 October 1643 – July 1646)

1660–1689
Commission of the Treasury (19 June – 8 September 1660)
Sir Edward Hyde, also Lord Chancellor
James Butler, 1st Marquess of Ormonde, also Lord Steward of the Household
Sir George Monck, also General of the Forces
Thomas Wriothesley, 4th Earl of Southampton
John Robartes, 2nd Baron Robartes, also Lord Privy Seal
Thomas Colepeper, 2nd Baron Colepeper
Sir Edward Montagu
Sir Edward Nicholas, principal Secretary of State
Sir William Morice, principal Secretary of State
Thomas Wriothesley, 4th Earl of Southampton (8 September 1660 – 16 May 1667)
Commission of the Treasury (1 June 1667 – 28 November 1672)
George Monck, 1st Duke of Albemarle, First Lord (until 3 January 1670)
Anthony Ashley-Cooper, 1st Baron Ashley, also Chancellor of the Exchequer
Sir Thomas Clifford, Comptroller of the Household
Sir William Coventry (until 8 April 1669)
Sir John Duncombe
Thomas Clifford, 1st Baron Clifford of Chudleigh (28 November 1672 – 24 June 1673)
Thomas Osborne, 1st Viscount Latimer (1st Earl of Danby from 1674) (24 June 1673 – 26 March 1679)
Commission of the Treasury (26 March – 21 November 1679)
Arthur Capell, 1st Earl of Essex, First Lord
Laurence Hyde
Sir John Ernle, also Chancellor of the Exchequer
Sir Edward Dering, 2nd Baronet
Sidney Godolphin
Commission of the Treasury (21 November 1679 – 9 September 1684)
Laurence Hyde, 1st Earl of Rochester, First Lord
Sir John Ernle, also Chancellor of the Exchequer
Sir Edward Dering, 2nd Baronet (until 9 July 1684)
Sidney Godolphin (until 9 July 1684)
Sir Stephen Fox
Sir Dudley North (since 26 July 1684)
Henry Frederick Thynne (since 26 July 1684)
Commission of the Treasury (9 September 1684 – 16 February 1685)
Sidney Godolphin, 1st Baron Godolphin, First Lord
Sir John Ernle, also Chancellor of the Exchequer
Sir Stephen Fox
Sir Dudley North
Henry Frederick Thynne
Laurence Hyde, 1st Earl of Rochester (16 February 1685 – 10 December 1686)
Commission of the Treasury (4 January 1687 – 9 April 1689)
John Belasyse, 1st Baron Belasyse, First Lord
Sidney Godolphin, 1st Baron Godolphin
Henry Jermyn, 1st Baron Dover
Sir John Ernle, also Chancellor of the Exchequer
Sir Stephen Fox

1689–1714
Commission of the Treasury (9 April 1689 – 18 March 1690)
Charles Mordaunt, 1st Earl of Monmouth, First Lord
Henry Booth, 2nd Baron Delamere, also Chancellor of the Exchequer
Sidney Godolphin, 1st Baron Godolphin
Sir Henry Capell
Richard Hampden
Commission of the Treasury (18 March 1690 – 15 November 1690)
Sir John Lowther, MP for Westmorland, First Lord
Richard Hampden, also Chancellor of the Exchequer
Sir Stephen Fox
Thomas Pelham
Commission of the Treasury (15 November 1690 – 1 May 1697)
Sidney Godolphin, 1st Baron Godolphin, First Lord
Sir John Lowther (until 21 March 1692)
Richard Hampden (until 2 May 1696), also Chancellor of the Exchequer (until 3 May 1694)
Sir Stephen Fox
Charles Montagu, also Chancellor of the Exchequer (since 3 May 1694)
Sir Edward Seymour, 4th Baronet (until 2 May 1696)
Sir William Trumbull (3 May 1694 – 1 November 1695)
John Smith MP for Bere Alston (since 3 May 1694)
Sir Thomas Littleton (since 2 May 1696)
Commission of the Treasury (1 May 1697 – 15 November 1699)
Charles Montagu, MP for Westminster, First Lord, also Chancellor of the Exchequer
Sir Stephen Fox
Sir Thomas Littleton, MP for Woodstock (until 1 June 1699)
Thomas Pelham, MP for Lewes (until 1 June 1699)
Ford Grey, 1st Earl of Tankerville (since 1 June 1699)
John Smith, MP for Andover (since 1 June 1699)
Henry Boyle, MP for Cambridge University (since 1 June 1699)
Commission of the Treasury (15 November 1699 – 9 December 1700)
Ford Grey, 1st Earl of Tankerville, First Lord
John Smith, MP for Andover, also Chancellor of the Exchequer
Sir Stephen Fox, MP for Cricklade
Richard Hill
Henry Boyle, MP for Cambridge University
Commission of the Treasury (9 December 1700 – 30 December 1701)
Sidney Godolphin, 1st Lord Godolphin, First Lord
John Smith, MP for Andover, also Chancellor of the Exchequer (until March 1701)
Sir Stephen Fox, MP for Cricklade
Henry Boyle, MP for Cambridge University, also Chancellor of the Exchequer since March 1701
Richard Hill
Thomas Pelham, MP for Lewes (since March 1701)
Commission of the Treasury (30 December 1701 – 8 May 1702)
Charles Howard, 3rd Earl of Carlisle, First Lord
Henry Boyle, MP for Cambridge University, also Chancellor of the Exchequer
Sir Stephen Fox, MP for Cricklade
Richard Hill
Thomas Pelham, MP for Lewes
Sidney Godolphin, 1st Earl of Godolphin (8 May 1702 – 11 August 1710)
Commission of the Treasury (11 August 1710 – 30 May 1711)
John Poulett, 1st Earl Poulett (First Lord)
Robert Harley, MP for Radnor until 23 May 1711, then 1st Earl of Oxford and Mortimer, also Chancellor of the Exchequer
Henry Paget, MP for Staffordshire
Sir Thomas Mansel, Baronet, MP for Glamorganshire
Robert Benson, MP for York
Robert Harley, 1st Earl of Oxford and Mortimer (30 May 1711 – 30 July 1714)
Charles Talbot, 1st Duke of Shrewsbury (30 July – 13 October 1714)

For later officers of the treasury, see List of Lords Commissioners of the Treasury.

References

Lord High Treasurers
 
Lord High Treasurers
Monarchy and money